Self-Portrait is a 1665 niche painting by Gerrit Dou. It shows the artist at the peak of his fame, holding a palette and surrounded by studio objects. It is in the collection of the Metropolitan Museum of Art, in New York.

Description

Like his teacher Rembrandt before him, Dou created several self-portraits, probably on commission for specific patrons who owned more than one of his works. Today about a dozen are known. This one came into the collection via the Benjamin Altman bequest.

This painting by Dou was documented by Hofstede de Groot in 1908, who wrote; "283. Portrait of the Painter.  Sm. 101 and Suppl. 60; M. 112. 
He stands at a window, holding palette and brushes in his left hand, and 
turning over with his right the leaves of a large book lying on the sill. 
He looks about forty. He wears a brownish vest with sleeves, a dark blue 
cloak embroidered with gold lace, and a light blue cap. A curtain hangs 
over the window-sill, partly covering the well-known relief by Duquesnoy 
of children playing with a he-goat, which is underneath the window. In 
the foreground is a pot of marigolds. A vine grows over one side of the 
window, where is hung a bird-cage. In the background is an easel 
with an open umbrella on the top. "A very beautiful and interesting 
picture " (Sm.). 
Blanc states wrongly that it was on canvas, measuring 28 inches 
by 23 1/2 inches.

The relief by Duquesnoy was used several times by Dou in other niche paintings:

Later influence
This painting was copied by Etienne Compardel, and perhaps it is this version that was used as an example by Jacob Houbraken for his father's dictionary of painters. Arnold Houbraken admired Dou so much he started his second volume of painter biographies called the Schouburgh with his biography, calling him with his contemporary Bartholomeus van der Helst "two guiding lights in the arts" and illustrating their portraits with two burning wicks.

References

Further reading
 Zelfportret van Gerard Dou (1613-1675), ca. 1665 in the RKD
Cat. no. 37 in Dutch Paintings in the Metropolitan Museum of Art Volume I, by Walter Liedtke, Metropolitan Museum of Art, 2007

Paintings by Gerrit Dou
1665 paintings
Paintings in the collection of the Metropolitan Museum of Art
Self-portraits